The 23rd Australian Film Institute Awards (generally known as the AFI Awards) were held at the Regent Theatre, in Sydney, New South Wales on 16 September 1981. Presented by the Australian Film Institute (AFI), the awards celebrated the best in Australian feature film, documentary and short film productions of 1981. The ceremony was televised in Australia on ABC for the third year running, with John Bluthal presiding over the event.

Gallipoli won nine of the twelve awards it was nominated for, including Best Film. Other films with multiple nominations were Hoodwink with eight, Winter of Our Dreams and Fatty Finn with seven, The Club with five, The Survivor and Roadgames with four, Wrong Side of the Road with three, and Grendel Grendel Grendel and Wu Ting with two. Phillip Adams was the recipient of the Raymond Longford Award

Winners and nominees
Gallipoli (1981) received the most feature-film nominations with twelve, winning in nine categories including Best Film, Best Achievement in Directing for Peter Weir, Best Screenplay for David Williamson, Best Achievement in Cinematography for Russell Boyd, Best Performance by an Actor in a Leading Role for Mel Gibson and Best Performance by an Actor in a Supporting Role for Bill Hunter. Other films with multiple nominations were Hoodwink with eight, Winter of Our Dreams and Fatty Finn with seven, The Club with five, The Survivor and Roadgames with four, Wrong Side of the Road with three, and Grendel Grendel Grendel and Wu Ting with two.

Individuals with multiple nominations were sound designer Peter Fenton with three for Best Sound, winning for his work on Gallipoli; sound designer Andrew Steuart received two nominations in the Best Sound category without a win; Judy Davis was nominated for Best Performance by an Actress in a Leading Role and Best Performance by an Actress in a Supporting Role for her roles in Winter of Our Dreams and Hoodwink, respectively, picking up both prizes; Wendy Weir gained two nominations for Best Achievement in Art Direction and Best Achievement in Costume Design, winning in the former category; David Williamson, who was given the Best Screenplay award, was also further nominated for his adapted screenplay of The Club in the same category.

Feature film

Non-feature film

Special awards
Wrong Side of the Road received the Jury Prize. The Raymond Longford Award given to a person for their life's work in the Australian film and television industry, was presented to Australian journalist and producer Phillip Adams.

References

External links
 The Australian Academy of Cinema and Television Arts official website

AACTA Awards ceremonies
AACTA Awards
AACTA Awards